Campylium chrysophyllum is a species of moss in the Amblystegiaceae family. It has a cosmopolitan distribution.

Campylium chrysophyllum is known to be able to use artificial light to grow in places which are otherwise devoid of natural light, such as Niagara Cave.

References 

Amblystegiaceae